Visa requirements for Mongolian citizens are administrative entry restrictions by the authorities of other states placed on citizens of Mongolia. As of 2 July 2019, Mongolian citizens had visa-free or visa on arrival access to 62 countries and territories, ranking the Mongolian passport 82nd in terms of travel freedom according to the Henley Passport Index.

Visa requirements map

Visa requirements

Territories and disputed areas
Visa requirements for Mongolian citizens for visits to various territories, disputed areas and restricted zones:

Non-visa restrictions

See also

 Visa policy of Mongolia
 Mongolian passport

References and Notes
References

Notes

Foreign relations of Mongolia
Mongolia